The customer is always right is a popular slogan within the service industry.

It may also refer to:

 The Customer is Always Right, a Sin City yarn
"The Customer is Always Right", two segments of Sin City (film)
 The Customer is Always Right (film), a 2006 South Korean film
 The Customer is Always Right (TV series), a 2019 BBC TV series
 "The Customer is Always Right?", broadcast on the Oprah Winfrey Network
 "The Customer is Always Right", an episode of Rainbow
 "The Customer's Always Right", an episode of The Tortellis
 "Customer's Always Right", a song on the 2006 album Phatso by American rapper Jamie Madrox
 "The Customer’s Always Right", a song in the 1961 musical Sail Away by Noël Coward
 "The customer is always right", translation of the Japanese phrase "kyakusama wa kamisama desu", popularized by Haruo Minami

See also
 Customer service